The 2012–13 UAE League Cup, commonly known as the Etisalat Emirates Cup for sponsorship reasons, is the fifth season of the league cup competition for teams in the UAE Pro-League. It started on 18 September 2012 and is scheduled to finish in May 2013. The current holders are Al Ahli who won their first title last season.

Format

The number of teams involved in the competition has increased this year from 12 to 14, in line with the league. As a result, there are now 3 instead of 2 groups in the initial group stage - two of 5 teams and one of 4 teams. The three teams who finish top of each group will advance automatically to the semi-finals, along with one runner-up.

Group stage

Group A

Source: Soccerway

Group B

Source: Soccerway

Group C

Source: Soccerway

Semi-finals

Final

References

External links
Emirates Cup tables and results at goalzz
Emirates Cup tables and results at Soccerway

UAE League Cup seasons
Etisalat Emirates Cup
2012–13 domestic association football cups